The 2010–11 season was Aberdeen's 98th season in the top flight of Scottish football and their 100th season overall. Aberdeen competed in the Scottish Premier League, Scottish Cup and Scottish League Cup.

Aberdeen began the season with successive league wins over Hamilton Academical and St Johnstone, but suffered a poor run of form in the following months, culminating in a club record 0–9 defeat to Celtic in November 2010. The following month, Mark McGhee was sacked as manager and replaced by Motherwell manager Craig Brown.

In the cups, Aberdeen reached the semi-final of the Scottish League Cup, losing 1–4 to Celtic in January 2011. Aberdeen also reached the semi-final of the Scottish Cup, losing 0–4 to Celtic in April 2011.

Pre-season and friendlies

Aberdeen announced a series of pre-season friendlies in May 2010, including a tour of England and games in Scotland and Germany. The first pre-season friendly on 17 July 2010 against Highland Football League club Fraserburgh ended in a 1–3 defeat for Aberdeen. The following day, Aberdeen won 2–0 against Peterhead, with Mitchel Megginson and Michael Paton scoring. On 21 July, Aberdeen lost 0–1 to Dunfermline Athletic.

Aberdeen's tour of England began in Tamworth on 24 July. Despite Aberdeen taking an early lead, Tamworth equalised early in the second half, and the game ended 1–1. Aberdeen's next game was against Port Vale, Aberdeen won 1–0 thanks to a Michael Paton penalty ten minutes before the end of the game. The tour of England concluded with a 0–1 defeat to Brighton & Hove Albion on 31 July 2010.

Aberdeen returned to Scotland to face Brechin City in a memorial match for former Brechin City chairman David Will on 4 August 2010. The result was a 2–2 draw, Fraser Fyvie and Andrew Considine scored for Aberdeen.
 Aberdeen's final pre-season game was in Germany against 1. FC Kaiserslautern on 7 August 2010. Aberdeen lost 0–2 to the Bundesliga club.

Transfers

Seven new players arrived at Pittodrie in the summer transfer window, including Scotland international Paul Hartley, who was appointed as team captain. Three players were signed on loan between September 2010 and the end of the January transfer window, in addition to three permanent signings. Full-back Ricky Foster joined Aberdeen's rivals Rangers F.C. on transfer deadline day in August on a season-long loan, with striker Andrius Velička moving in the opposite direction.

In

The end of the previous season saw three on-loan players return to their clubs. Paul Marshall, Jim Paterson and last season's top scorer Steven MacLean all left to go back to their parent club. Eight out-of-contract players departed Aberdeen on free transfers in the summer, including left-back Charlie Mulgrew, who rejoined Celtic, and former captain Mark Kerr, who joined Greek club Asteras Tripolis. Only one player left the club in the January transfer window, English defender Jerel Ifil, who was released from his contract.

Out

Statistics

Appearances and Goals

|}

Disciplinary record

Goal scorers

Results and fixtures

Scottish Premier League

Scottish League Cup

Scottish Cup

Competitions

Overall

SPL

League table

Results summary

Results by round

Results by opponent

Source: 2010–11 Scottish Premier League article

See also
 List of Aberdeen F.C. seasons

References

Aberdeen F.C. seasons
Aberdeen